John Punualii Naumu (September 30, 1919 – September 23, 1982) was an American football player who played at the halfback position. He played college football for Stanford and professional football for the Los Angeles Dons.

Early years
Naumu was born in 1919 in Honolulu. He attended President William McKinley High School in Honolulu.

Military and college football
He played college football for Hawaii from 1939 to 1941. His college career was interrupted by service in the United States Army during World War II. After the war, he rejoined the Hawaii football team in January 1945 and during the 1945 season.  In 1946, he transferred to the University of Southern California. He played at the halfback position for USC in 1946 and 1947.

Professional football
He played professional football in the All-America Football Conference for the Los Angeles Dons during their 1948 season. He appeared in eight games.

Later years
Naumu served in the Hawaii National Guard with the rank of colonel. He was also vice president of Honolulu Federal Savings & Loan. He died in 1982 in Honolulu at age 62 after collapsing while playing racquetball.

References

1919 births
1982 deaths
Los Angeles Dons players
Hawaii Rainbow Warriors football players
USC Trojans football players
Players of American football from Hawaii
American football halfbacks
United States Army personnel of World War II
Hawaii National Guard personnel
National Guard (United States) colonels